Catherine Fitzpatrick  may refer to:

Catherine A. Fitzpatrick, human rights activist and journalist
Catherine Fitzpatrick (choir director), founder and conductor of St. Mary's Cathedral Choir, Sydney, Australia

See also
Cathryn Fitzpatrick, Australian cricketer
Kathleen Fitzpatrick (disambiguation)